The 1941 Ole Miss Rebels football team was an American football team that represented the University of Mississippi in the Southeastern Conference (SEC) during the 1941 college football season. In their fourth season under head coach Harry Mehre, the Rebels compiled a 6–2–1 record (2–1–1 against SEC opponents), outscored opponents by a total of 131 to 67, finished fifth in the conference, and were ranked No. 17 in the final AP Poll. The Rebels played their home games at Hemingway Stadium in Oxford, Mississippi. Ole Miss was ranked in the final AP Poll for the first time in school history.

J.W. "Wobble" Davidson and guard Homer "Larry" Hazel Jr. were the team captains. Six Ole Miss players were selected by the Associated Press (AP) or United Press (UP) for the 1941 All-SEC football team: Hazel (AP-1, UP-1); halfback Merle Hapes (AP-1); tackle Bill Eubanks (AP-1); halfback Junie Hovious (AP-2); guard Oscar Britt (AP-2); and tackle Chet Kozel (AP-3).

Schedule

Roster
E Ray Poole

References

Ole Miss
Ole Miss Rebels football seasons
Ole Miss Rebels football